Sonpur is a Tehsil/Block in the Saran district of Bihar. The Sub-district code of Sonpur block is 01267. There are about 91 villages in Sonpur block.

List of Sonpur tehsil villages
Abdul Hai
Akilpur
Apsaid
Babhanganwan
Badurahi
Baijalpur
Baijalpur Fakir
Baijalpur Faqir
Baijalpur Jamuni
Baijalpur Kesho
Baijalpur Tamuni
Banwari Chak
Baqarpur
Barbatta
Bariar Chak
Bharanpura
Chhitar Chak
Chak Daria Sultanpur
Chak Jujhari
ChakDaria
Chandpura
Chaturpur
Chausia
Chhapra
Chhitar Chak
Chittu Pakar
Chitarsenpur
Damodarpur
Dariyapur
Dudhaila
Dumari Buzurg
Faqrabad
Gangajal
Garibpatti
Gheghta
Gobind Chak
Gopalpur
Hasanpur
Hasilpur
Ismail Chak
Jahangirpur
Jaitiya
Jan Mohammad
Kalyanpur
Kapur Chak
Karam Chak
Kasmar
Kasturi Chak
Kharika
Khemi Chak
Khuntaha
Ladanpur
Lahlad Chak
Lawang Patti
Lodipur
Mahammadali Chak
Mahmud Chak
Makhdumpur
Makra
Milki
Mirzapur
Mohabatpur
Mohammadpur
Murgia Chak
Murthan
Mustafa Chak
Naudiha
Nawada
Naya Gaon
Nazarmira
Pahleza Ghat
Parmanandpur
Parvezabad
Rahar Diyara
Rahimpur
Raipur Hasanpur
Rajapur
Ramsapur
Rasen Chak
Rasulpur
Saidpur
sabalpur
Salehpur
Semara
Shahpur
Shekh Duman
Shikarpur
Sighinpur
Siktia
Sobhepur
Sultanpur

Sonepur